Cecilia Birgitta Vennersten-Ingemansson (born 26 September 1970 in Gothenburg) is a Swedish pop singer.

Cecilia Vennersten performed the Mariah Carey song "Hero" on Sikta mot stjärnorna in 1994.

Her career started with a second place finish in the Swedish qualifier for the Eurovision Song Contest with the song "Det vackraste". Her first album, named Cecilia Vennersten, released the same year, was a great success in Sweden and Norway. In 1997, her second album, Till varje leende, en tår, was released. She participated in Melodifestivalen 2005 with the ballad "Var mig nära", but she didn't quality for the final. In 2006, her third album, Under stjärnornas parasoll, was released.

Discography

Albums

References

External links

1970 births
Living people
Singers from Gothenburg
Swedish pop singers
21st-century Swedish singers
Melodifestivalen contestants of 2005
Melodifestivalen contestants of 1995